San Nicola is a Romanesque-style, Roman Catholic church located in the town of Atri, province of Teramo, region of Abruzzo, Italy.

History
First founded in the 11th century and rebuilt in 1256, St Nicola’s Church was rebuilt over the centuries.

The front portal has a rounded arch. It is surmounted by a simple oculus and flanked by two rustic pilasters emerging from the brick facade. Internally the church with its three naves, separated by thick columns and three semicircular apses. A series of low pointed Gothic arches, as well as the short thick pillars, all belong to the 13th-century reconstruction. A fresco (circa 1440) by Andrea De Litio is painted above the baptismal font on the counterfacade, depicting the Madonna of Loreto among angels and Saints Roch and Sebastian.

References

11th-century Roman Catholic church buildings in Italy
13th-century Roman Catholic church buildings in Italy
Churches in the province of Teramo
Churches completed in 1255
Romanesque architecture in Abruzzo